The Detroit Black Community Food Security Network (DBCFSN) is an urban, community-oriented, predominantly black, grassroots food justice group. The organization was initiated by a communal desire to start an organic garden collective, and has grown from its founding in 2006 with over 50 Detroit residents as members. In an effort to combat food insecurity and increase food sovereignty, DBCFSN established a community accessible food farm in 2008, known as D-Town Farm, which grows over 30 types of fruits and vegetables on seven acres of land.

The goal of the organization is to increase food security and sovereignty within Detroit's black population. It formulates efforts to provide communal access to spaces where food is healthy, available, and affordable. DBCFSN uses community activism, alliance building and educational programs to highlight various structures which perpetuate the inequality of black communities in present-day Detroit. Currently, DBCFSN is working to establish the Detroit People's Food Cooperative, with the goal of opening by mid-to-late 2019.

History

Pretext for founding
Following the 1950s city demolition of Black Bottom and Paradise Valley for highway construction, the residents of Detroit increased the presence of the Black Power Movement, and the Civil Rights Movement, throughout the 1960s.  By 1967, Pastor Albert Cleage, founder of the Central United Church of Christ, later named the Shrines of the Black Madonna of the Pan-African Orthodox Christian Church, founded the Black Star Market, the first black communal cooperative business. The co-op closed within two years, but started forming the framework for much of DBCFSN's work. Mayor Coleman Young of Detroit developed and implemented the Farm-A-Lot program in 1975 to encourage urban agriculture in the city, but the impact of this effort faded at the turn of the century.

Outside and foreign investors, white flight, and the collapse of the automobile industry have made it difficult for local Detroit residents to own land, a reflection of the trend since 1910 of African American land ownership. The 1980s of Detroit maintained a trend of supermarket closures, with Farmer Jack, the last chain grocery store in Detroit in 2007. Years before the United States financial crisis of 2008, Detroit entered a recession. After the country-wide recession struck, Detroit's depression worsened, which resulted in increases in unemployment, crime, and poverty levels.

One third of Detroit residents do not own automobiles and many passengers of public transportation wait an hour at bus stops. The low economic status of the city is illustrated by the following statistics: 30% of Detroit's residents remain unemployed, and 36% live in poverty. Additionally, the Food Access Research Atlas (FARA) has designated Detroit as a low income and low food access region. Classified as a food desert, 80% of Detroit residents rely on "fringe food" provided by fast food chains, liquor stores, and corner stores. To address food insecurity, the city of Detroit has launched the Detroit Agricultural Network (DAN) in 1997, and the Garden Resource Program in 2004, later named Keep Detroit Growing in 2013. The Detroit Food and Fitness Collaborative is an overarching group of 40 organizations, including Keep Growing Detroit and the Detroit Food Justice Task Force. The organizations work to ensure that children and families have access to healthy, locally-grown food, and they work to promote healthier life styles. The city is also one of nine communities across the country to receive assistance from the W.K. Kellogg Foundation in efforts to promote community involvement and growth in ensuring lifestyles of health and fitness. The W.K. Kellogg Foundation promotes the idea that all children should have equal opportunity to live and thrive, focusing on communities where children and families are vulnerable. Communities within Detroit utilize these efforts along with several other organizations to address the growing issue of poverty, and to spread awareness of the impacts that these social issues can pose.

Founding
In 2000, Malik Yakini, principal of Nsoroma Institute Public School Academy charter school, worked with staff, parents and supporters (including Anan Lololi of the Afr-Can FoodBasket from Toronto) to implement organic gardening and to develop a food security curriculum. The garden grew to form the Shamba Organic Garden Collective (SOGC), where faculty and parents plotted and maintained 20 gardens in backyards and vacant lots. "Groundbreakers" took on the role of tilling gardens for community members who were unable to do so. The founding meeting of DBCFSN occurred in 2006 when Yakini assembled a group of 40 community members strongly connected to food at the Black Star Community Bookstore. This would have not been possible without the organizations effect in influencing public policy. People such as JoAnne Watson and council man Kwame Kenyatta were crucial characters in connecting this cause to the people within the Detroit City Council who eventually approved the food security policy. The specific policy in which DBCFSN is particularly concerned is "the Right to Farm act." This states no higher power has authority to create laws and regulate agriculture in their area. This is an important case for DBCFS because they need to refrain from breaking any laws and regulations while carrying out the mission to develop healthy urban agricultural systems.

The group discussed the need for black community involvement in urban agriculture, as well as food justice, security and sovereignty. The newfound Detroit Black Community Food Security Network began gardening on a quarter-acre plot of land in Detroit's east side, quickly moving to a half-acre plot in Detroit's westside. In 2008, DBCFSN secured a long-term lease on seven acres of property in Rouge Park, establishing D-Town Farm as the city's largest community run farm. Currently, DBCFSN operates the D-Town Farm, The Food Warriors Youth Development Program (under the leadership of Education and Outreach Director Hanifa Adjuman) and is opening the Detroit People's Food Cooperative in 2019.

Structure
Detroit Black Community Food Security Network has more than 70 members, of which 80% are women, including individuals, seven families, and one organization. The D-Town Farm maintains one full-time employee, five part‐time farmers, and around ten internships annually. Many of the members are lifelong "Detroiters". Members of DBCFSN generally identify with Black Nationalism and political analysis from the Black Power Movement, and have been engaged with community involvement in prior experiences.

Executive Director
Malik Yakini, the primary co-founder of DBCFSN and the Executive Director of the organization, handles the daily operations of the organization. His experience promoting food justice in the African-centered charter school Nsoroma Institute Public School Academy in Detroit provided a platform for community engagement and education. His work as a black liberation activist and bookstore owner has made him popular among Detroit's black residents. Within the Detroit community, he is known as an urban farming pioneer, as well as an advocate for the urban agricultural movement. Additionally, he is an educator, he teaches topics such as African history and culture, sustainable agriculture, and systems of oppression including white supremacy, capitalism, and patriarchy. His work is directed to guide and inspire members of the community to join in the drive to build more localized urban agricultural systems for struggling Detroit community members.

Board of Directors and staff
The Board of Directors for DBCFSN includes Albert Seevers, Shakara Tyler, Nikolette Barnes, Ndidika Vernon and Charles Needham. This board determine the organizational policies of DBCFSN and appoints the Executive Director. Nikolette Barnes is also on the staff of Keep Growing Detroit, an organization that promotes the growth and production of urban gardening throughout Detroit. The organization works closely with efforts similar to those of the DBCFSN, urging community members to think proactively about the sources of their food, and encouraging the support of local gardening efforts. Similar to the DBSFSN, Keep Growing Detroit also includes educational efforts, such as youth programs, which aim to provide more information about food sovereignty to the community. The organizations work simultaneously towards the same goal, which is to increase efforts of community engagement combating food insecurity.

Membership information
There are three levels of membership in DBCFSN: an individual membership which is $10 in annual dues, a family membership which is $25, and an organizational membership which costs $120. All of the money supports DBCFSN's community work, and members are eligible for D-Town farm produce discounts. Membership meetings are held monthly at the DBCFSN office (11000 W McNichols, Suite 103, Detroit, MI 48221). This membership connects people through the Detroit People's Food Co-op. This Co-op is a part of DBCFN's community development complex known as the Detroit Food Commons. A significant community development project that connects the local community to a large amount of resources to better themselves and their knowledge and well-being.

Framework
DBCFSN extends the legacy of the Black Freedom Movement, attributing foundational ideas to those of Ida B. Wells, Malcolm X, Fannie Lou Hamer, Rev. Albert B. Cleage and others . The organization identifies love, black self-determination, integrity, justice, respect for life and nature, and sustainability as their core values. Their work is dedicated to creating co-operative systems of agricultural development that will better the lives of community members.

DBCFSN aims to transform the city of Detroit by encouraging African Americans to take control of their food system. DBCFSN models community and self-determination, and they direct youth into food related fields. They maintain a policy framework that aims to eliminate barriers preventing African-American land ownership, and redistribute wealth through co-operative communal ownership This is represented in the since that DBCFSN connects with the Detroits Peoples Food Co-op and the Detroit Food Commons, creating a large scale multifaceted community engagement project.

Land ownership

2006-2008
Upon their formation, DBCFSN acquired use of a quarter-acre plot of land near the 4-H Club on McClellan in the Eastside of Detroit in 2006, and the land was purchased by a developer in the fall of that year. In June 2007, the organization acquired use of a half-acre plot of land owned by the Pan African Orthodox Christian Church.

2008: $1 lease
After 2 years of planning and meetings with the Detroit City Council and the City Planning and Recreation Department, DBCFSN acquired a temporary 10-year license agreement to use a designated two-acre site in the City of Detroit's Meyers' Tree Nursery in Rouge Park for $1 annually. In 2010, the site expanded from two to seven acres, becoming the permanent placement for the D-Town Farm. The lease expires in 2018.

Funding
Between 2006 and 2010, DBCFSN was funded solely through membership dues and contributions of members and supporters. The D-Town Farm hosts an annual Harvest Festival which attracts local and regional supporters by the hundreds. In 2010, the organization received funding from the W.K. Kellogg Foundation, one of the top 3 U.S. funders of sustainable agriculture and the alternative agri-food movement.

In 2015, the Greening of Detroit and DBCFSN collaborated to receive a USDA Beginning Framers and Ranchers Grant to train new farmers in Detroit. In 2016, DBCFSN, along with six other healthy food businesses, received a grant from Michigan Good Food Fund. Funding has also come from various USDA grants, as well as the Fair Food Network, Metabolic Lab, Capital Impact Partners, Detroit Economic Growth Corporation, City Connect and Whole Foods Market.

Membership 
There are three types of membership one can have in the DBCFSN, Organizational, Family, and Individual, though the difference between the three (besides the price) isn't clear. Anyone with a membership can vote. Members rely on multiple streams of funding such as grants and loans from members, and the purchase of shares to set the groundwork for the co-op; this ensures the just values and integrity of the co-op are in rooted in intentionality and maintenance. The goal of the project is to reach 1,200 member/owners by 2019.

Agricultural initiatives

D-Town Farm
This program began in the crop season of 2006, but became officiated in 2008 with the acquisition of land in Rogue Park. The structures implemented on the seven-acre plot include several hoop houses, in-ground vegetable plots, composting sites, an apple orchard and a bee-keeping operation. During the 2010 growing season, they produced upwards of 37 crops, including acorn squash, zucchini, kale, collards, tomatoes, basil, green beans, cabbage, watermelon, pumpkins, beets, turnips, and radishes. The D-Town farm is operated by volunteer communal DBCFSN members who assist the farm in selling the crops to various farmers markets.

Ujamaa Food Co-operative Food Buying Club
This co-operative, operated by DBCFSN from 2008 to 2016, provided community members with an alternative place to buy household goods, bulk items, healthy foods and supplements for an affordable price. The word "Ujamaa" comes from the Swahili term for "collective economics". The Ujamaa Food Buying Club works with the Uprooting Racism, Planting Justice Program. in forming anti-racism dialogues in Detroit. There are currently 100 members of the Ujamaa Food Co-op in the Detroit metro area. This system alleviates the issue for these 100 members to shop primarily at fringe food retail stores.

Detroit People's Food Co-operative
DBCFSN has been working since 2010 to launch the Detroit People's Food Co-operative in 2018, although the opening date has since been changed to 2019. The co-op intends to increase community ownership and food access among Detroit's Historic North End's residents. The co-op is expected to introduce over 20 jobs to the area, with aspirations of 1,200 community members joining the program.

Detroit Food Commons Project 
Malik Yakini and DBCFSN are currently working on a project named the Detroit Food Commons Project. It will be 30,000 square feet, and will feature the Detroit People's Food Co-op mentioned above, a local cafe, kitchen, and meeting rooms for DBCFSN and the local community. Because the project is so large in scale, there have been some difficulties getting it together. This project has been worked on for seven years.

Community outreach and engagement

Food Warriors Youth Development Program
DBCFSN established the Food Warriors Youth Development Program as an African-centered program for young people between ages 5 and 12, that seeks to educate Detroit youth on food, where it comes from, and how to grow it locally and sustainably. It consists of an after-school program at Timbuktu Academy of Science and Technology and a Saturday Community Food Warriors Program at the Pan African Orthodox Christian Church. Children are provided with tools to develop their own sense of agency by learning how to plant, tend, and harvest a garden and how healthy eating is connected to the health of their overall community. The program also strives to de-stigmatize the connection many people have between agriculture and African Americans. What really sets the Food Warriors initiative apart is their seven principles of Nguzo Saba. This is a set of core values that signify the importance of strengthening the family, community and the African centered paradigm.

"What's For Dinner" lecture series
The "What's For Dinner" lecture series is hosted by DBCFSN through the Charles H. Wright Museum of African American History annually during the months of April, June, August and October. The lectures are free and open to the public, and concentrate on issues within the food system with intentions of informing the Detroit public. Previous lecturers at these events include Dr. Jessica B. Harriss, Cashawn Meyers and Anthony Hatinger.

Political involvement
The roots of DBCFSN trace back to the U.S. Civil Rights Movement and the Black Power Movement within Detroit. The organization operates under a food sovereignty policy framework, guided by principles including food as a human right, agrarian reform, protection of natural resources, reorganization of food trade, ending hunger, peace and democracy. In June 2006, chaired by JoAnn Watson, DBCFSN spoke before the Neighborhood and Community Service Standing Committee of the Detroit City Council to implement a food security policy for the city of Detroit.

The Public Policy Committee of DBCFSN presented the draft at a public forum during their September 2007 Harvest Festival. The City Council of Detroit unanimously passed the Detroit Food Security Policy bill on March 25, 2008. The bill includes plans for developing a food system analysis database for Detroit, undertaking data collection on hunger and malnutrition, formulating recommendations for alternative food systems such as urban agriculture, creating citizen education guidelines, and producing an emergency response plan in the event of a natural disaster.

References

Organizations based in Detroit
Organizations established in 2006
2006 establishments in Michigan
Food security in the United States
Community gardening in the United States
African-American organizations
Urban agriculture
Agriculture in Michigan